Polystira is a genus of sea snails, marine gastropod mollusks in the family Turridae, the turrids.

Taxonomy
Paul Bartsch (1934) states the genus Polystira was created by W. P. Woodring in 1928 for certain large West Indian turrids. He named the largest of the recent species, generally known as Pleurotoma albida Perry, as type. Unfortunately, the mollusk so designated is not Pleurotoma albida Perry, which Perry states " is frequently found at New Zealand and Lord Howe Island." Perry's figure 4, plate 32, of this species does not agree with the West Indian material. It clearly resembles certain shells from North Australia in the collection of the National Museum. The name is, therefore, not applicable to the West Indian shell, which will have to carry the next available designation. Lamarck in 1816, in his " Tableau Encyclopedique et Methodique ", figured on plate 439, as figure 2, the West Indian shell without naming it. Wood, in 1818, in his " Index Testaceologicus ", on page 125, names this species Murex virgo, referring to Lamarck's figure cited above. This appears to be the oldest available name for the type species. The type of Polystira Woodring must therefore be Murex virgo Wood = Polystira albida Woodring, not Perry.

Distribution
This marine genus occurs on the American continent. Its radiation is extensive within its tropics and subtropics with a high species diversity. Several species also occur in the tropical eastern Pacific.

Species
Almost 100 extant species have not yet been described. 

Species recognized within the genus Polystira include:
 Polystira albida (G. Perry, 1811)
 Polystira antillarum (Crosse, 1865)
 Polystira artia Berry, 1957
 Polystira bayeri Petuch, 2001
 Polystira coltrorum Petuch, 1993<ref></ref> Polystira cubacaribbaea Espinosa, Ortea & Moro, 2017
 Polystira eloinae Espinosa, Ortea & Moro, 2017
 Polystira florencae Bartsch, 1934
 Polystira formosissima (Smith E. A., 1915)
 Polystira gruneri (Philippi, 1848)
 Polystira jaguaella Espinosa, Ortea & Moro, 2017
 Polystira jelskii (Crosse, 1865) 
 Polystira jiguaniensis Espinosa, Ortea & Moro, 2017
 Polystira juangrinensis Espinosa, Ortea & Moro, 2017
 Polystira lindae Petuch, 1987
 Polystira macra Bartsch, 1934
 Polystira nobilis (Hinds, 1843)
 Polystira oxytropis (G.B. Sowerby I, 1834)
 Polystira parthenia Berry, 1957
 Polystira parvula Espinosa, Ortea & Moro, 2017
 Polystira picta (Reeve, 1843)
 Polystira starretti Petuch, 2002
 Polystira sunderlandi Petuch, 1987
 Polystira tellea (Dall, 1889)
 Polystira vibex (Dall, 1889)
Species brought into synonymy
  Polystira barretti (Guppy, 1866): synonym of Polystira albida (G. Perry, 1811)
 Polystira hilli Petuch, 1988: synonym of Polystira jelskii (Crosse, 1865)
 Polystira phillipsi Nowell-Usticke, 1969: synonym of Polystira gruneri (Philippi, 1848)
 Polystira staretti Petuch, 2002 : synonym of Polystira starretti Petuch, 2002

References

 Perry, G. (1811) Conchology. iv + 5 pp. [61 plates] William Miller: London
 Guppy, R.J.L. (1866) On the Tertiary Mollusca of Jamaica. Quarterly Journal of the Geological Society of London, 22, 281–295.
 Berry, S.S. (1957) Notices of new Eastern Pacific Mollusca.—I. Leaflets in Malacology, 1, 75–82.
 Petuch, E.J. (1987) New Caribbean molluscan faunas. Coastal Education & Research Foundation, Charlottesville, Virginia, [v], 154 pp.
 Petuch, E.J. (1993) Una nuova Polystira/A new Polystira. La Conchiglia: Rivista Internazionale di Malacologia/The Shell: International Shell Magazine, 267, 62–63.
 Petuch, E.J. (2001) New gastropods named for Frederick M. Bayer, in recognition of his contributions to tropical western Atlantic malacology. Bulletin of the Biological Society of Washington, 10, 334–343.
 Petuch, E.J. (2002) New deep water gastropods from the Bimini Shelf, Bimini Chain, Bahamas. Ruthenica, 12, 59–72

External links
 Woodring W.P.B. (1928). Miocene mollusks from Bowden, Jamaica. 2. Gastropods and discussion of results. Carnegie Institution of Washington Publication. 385: vii + 564 pp., 40 pls.
  Tucker, J.K. 2004 Catalog of recent and fossil turrids (Mollusca: Gastropoda). Zootaxa 682:1-1295.
 Bouchet, P.; Kantor, Y. I.; Sysoev, A.; Puillandre, N. (2011). A new operational classification of the Conoidea (Gastropoda). Journal of Molluscan Studies. 77(3): 273-308.
  Todd J.A. & Rawlings T.A. (2014). A review of the Polystira clade — the Neotropic’s largest marine gastropod radiation (Neogastropoda: Conoidea: Turridae sensu stricto). Zootaxa. 3884(5): 445-491

Turridae